Don Stone is the founder of numerous long-running publications in Atlanta, Georgia; former Atlanta radio general manager (WAEC, 860AM) (1979-1994) and Savannah, Georgia WSAV-TV news weatherman (1974-1976).

Publications
 The Atlanta Christian Business Directory (since 1983)
 Atlanta Christian Magazine and E-Blast Newsletter (since 1987)
 The Georgia Tech Express sports magazine and E-Blast Newsletter (since 1989)
 The Braves Express magazine and E-Blast Newsletter (since 1991)
 Healthy Living Atlanta magazine, website and E-Blast Newsletter (since 1996)
 Football Atlanta magazine (since 1998)
 Georgia Football magazine (since 1996)
 The Stripers Express Website & E-Blast Newsletter covering the Gwinnett Stripers (AAA) team (since 2009)
 Atlanta Christian Media Group (since 1994)
 Kennesaw State Sports E-Blast Newsletter (since 2015)
 Country Music Atlanta Website and E-Blast Newsletter (Since 2018)
 Creator of
 www.AtlantaChristianWeb.com
 GeorgiaTechExpress.com
 FootballAtlanta.com
 Georgia-Football.com
 Braves-Express.com
  StripersExpress.com]
 KennesawStateSports.com
 http://www.HealthLivingAtlanta.com
 http://www.CountryMusicAtlanta.com

Formerly disk jockey (WRAJ-AM/FM Anna, Illinois 1972-1974), TV weatherman at WSAV-TV in Savannah, GA (1974-1977)  and general manager of LOVE 86, WAEC Radio in Atlanta (1979-1994).
Don Stone is an alumnus of Southern Illinois University (1970-1974), Meramec Community College (1968-1970) Florissant Valley Community College (1969) Missouri University (1969) and University City High School in St. Louis (1968).

References 

American publishers (people)
Living people
Year of birth missing (living people)